Neomyia cornicina is a common species of fly which is distributed across many parts the Palaearctic. It has been introduced in the Nearctic.

References

Muscidae
Diptera of Europe
Insects described in 1781
Taxa named by Johan Christian Fabricius